The Next Civil War: Dispatches from the American Future is a non-fiction book by Canadian novelist and journalist Stephen Marche. The author suggests that the US could come to be governed by a right wing dictatorship within the next decade.

It is based on "sophisticated predictive models and nearly two hundred interviews with experts—civil war scholars, military leaders, law enforcement officials, secret service agents, agricultural specialists, environmentalists, war historians, and political scientists". Marche prepared plans for the next civil war by negotiating with soldiers and army experts who take control of conflicts.

Background
In October 2018, an essay named "The Next American Civil War" was written by Canadian novelist and journalist Stephen Marche in The Walrus. It was mentioned that such a war would have an impact on Canada. Marche wrote that "Figuring out what will happen there means figuring out what we will eventually face here." After two years, this article was published in the form of a book called The Next Civil War: Dispatches from the American Future. The book contains arguments and issues about contemporary American history which were discussed completely. Finally, the author made predictions about America's future.

Context
As the title of the book shows, the author swings back and forth between the high possibility of a civil war and the idea of the ability to avoid such a war. As Marche mentioned, the next civil war in America will raise from meaning, "Difference is the core of the American experience." American citizens could not tolerate economic or social inequalities.

The author explained five "potential scenarios" of how the civil war might happen in the US: "a violent confrontation between the federal government and a posse of far-right militias, the assassination of a Democratic president, the destruction of New York City in a super hurricane, the detonation of a dirty bomb in Washington DC, and the relatively peaceful secession of states that have realized their cultural and political differences outweigh their shared history".

According to the review written by Ed Simon, Marche believed that the deputization of troops in Washington DC, the right-wing attacks on elected officials, the disruption of the peaceful transition of power, and the insurrection of January 6 paves the way to begin the civil war in America. He wrote that if you had read "about them in another country, you would think a civil war had already begun." Because Americans have a clear picture of the civil war, they cannot consider mentioned occurrences as a sign of civil conflict. Ed Simon confirms what Marche has said about America’s democracy, "After the Trump years, the Democrats have attempted to salve the wounds inflicted on American institutions, but they remain overwhelmingly committed to the old ways, to the United States they grew up in".

The last two chapters of the book are named "The End of the Republic" and "A Note on American Hope".

Reviews
Ed Simon agreed with Marche's criticism of a lack of concern among American liberals, where he stated, "American liberals in the major cities retain a kind of desperate faith in the country’s institutions that amounts nearly to delusion".

Kirkus Reviews, an American book review magazine, regards the book as being well researched.

Marche has to deal with people who expect a complete and lengthy study of the ongoing events of America, but the fact is that "history is galloping too quickly to even attempt a long view".

Fintan O’Toole, writing for The Atlantic strongly criticised the book. According to him, the author was promoting a doomsday mentality which would only contribute to further partisanship and possible violence, as was in the case of Northern Ireland during The Troubles.

See also
 American imperialism
 How Civil Wars Start

References

Political books
Canadian non-fiction books
2022 non-fiction books
Books about the United States
Canadian political books
Books about politics of the United States
Books about North America
Simon & Schuster books
Avid Reader Press books
Current affairs books